Ocvian Chanigio (born 16 October 1999) is an Indonesian professional footballer who plays as an attacking midfielder for Liga 2 club PSIM Yogyakarta.

Club career

PSS Sleman
He was signed for PSS Sleman to play in Liga 1. Chanigio made his debut on 4 October 2019 in a match against Bhayangkara. On 3 December 2019, Chanigio scored his first goal for PSS against Badak Lampung in the 56th minute at the Maguwoharjo Stadium, Sleman.

PSIM Yogyakarta
Chanigio was signed for PSIM Yogyakarta to play in Liga 1 in the 2022 season.

Career statistics

Club

Notes

Honours

Club 
PSS Sleman
 Menpora Cup third place: 2021

References

External links
 Ocvian Chanigio at Soccerway
 Ocvian Chanigio at Liga Indonesia

1999 births
Living people
Indonesian footballers
PSS Sleman players
Association football midfielders
People from Temanggung Regency
Sportspeople from Central Java